Sheikh Sakhr Abū l-Barakat, was the nephew and successor of Sheikh Adi ibn Musafir, around whom the ‘Adawiyya order had formed. When ‘Adī died childless, Sakhr replaced him. He was executed by the Mongols in 1221-1222. He was succeeded by his eldest son Al-Hasan Ibn Adi.

Succession

References

Adawiyya Sufi Order
Year of birth unknown
Year of death unknown